Change is an Armenian sitcom television series. The series premiered on Armenia Premium on November 1, 2016. Since then, the series has aired on Tuesdays and Thursdays at 21:00. The last episode aired on June 22, 2017.

The series took place in Yerevan, Armenia.

References

External links

Armenian comedy television series
Armenian-language television shows
Armenia TV original programming
2010s sitcoms
2016 Armenian television series debuts
2010s Armenian television series
2017 Armenian television series endings